Sukenobu (written: 祐信, 輔信 or 資順) is a masculine Japanese given name. Notable people with the name include:

, Japanese speed skater
, Japanese printmaker
, Japanese daimyō
, Japanese kugyō

See also
Sukenobu Station, a railway station in Hamamatsu, Shizuoka Prefecture, Japan

Japanese masculine given names